Runina is a village and municipality in Snina District in the Prešov Region of north-eastern Slovakia. The first written reference of the village dates back to 1569. The municipality lies at an altitude of 550 metres and covers an area of 22.198 km2. According to the 2013 census it had a population of 75 inhabitants.

The village situated in the buffer zone of the Poloniny National Park offers easy access to most of the National Park's hiking trails. Stužica, a component of the Primeval Beech Forests of the Carpathians UNESCO World Heritage Site is also close to the village.

References

External links
 
 
 Runina na Facebooku

Villages and municipalities in Snina District
Zemplín (region)